Henry-Remsen House was a historic home located at Colonie in Albany County, New York.  It was an example of a Greek Revival–style farmhouse.  The earliest portion of the house, a -story ell, was built between about 1830 and 1850.  The main structure was two stories with a pedimented gable roof.  Other additions were completed between 1860 and the 1920s. Also on the property was a contributing barn. It is no longer extant; it has been dismantled.

It was listed on the National Register of Historic Places in 1985.

References

Houses on the National Register of Historic Places in New York (state)
Greek Revival houses in New York (state)
Houses in Albany County, New York
Demolished buildings and structures in New York (state)
National Register of Historic Places in Albany County, New York